The Primary Production, Power and Construction functional constituency was in the elections for the Legislative Council of Hong Kong first created for the 1995 LegCo Election as one of the nine new functional constituencies under the electoral reform carried out by the then Governor Chris Patten, in which the electorate consisted of total of 75,174 eligible voters worked related to the agriculture, fisheries, mining, energy and construction sectors.

The Constituency was abolished with the colonial Legislative Council dissolved after the transfer of the sovereignty in 1997.

A similar Agriculture and Fisheries functional constituency was created for the 1998 election by the HKSAR government with a much narrow electorate base which only consists of agriculture and fisheries organisations.

Councillors represented

Election results

References

Constituencies of Hong Kong
Constituencies of Hong Kong Legislative Council
1995 establishments in Hong Kong
Constituencies established in 1995
1997 disestablishments in Hong Kong
Constituencies disestablished in 1997
Agriculture in Hong Kong
Fisheries in Hong Kong
Energy in Hong Kong